Soboth (Slovene: Sobota) was a municipality in Austria which merged in January 2015 into Eibiswald in the Deutschlandsberg District in the Austrian state of Styria.

The Soboth Pass and Soboth reservoir are located near Soboth.

Population

References

Cities and towns in Deutschlandsberg District